The 1954 United States Senate election in Montana took place on November 2, 1954. Incumbent United States Senator James E. Murray, who was first elected to the Senate in a special election in 1934 and was re-elected in 1936, 1942, and 1948, ran for re-election. After winning the Democratic primary against trivial opponents, he advanced to the general election, where he was opposed by Wesley A. D'Ewart, the Republican nominee and the United States Congressman from Montana's 2nd congressional district. A contentious and close election ensued, but ultimately, Murray was able to narrowly win re-election over D'Ewart to a final term in the Senate.

Democratic primary

Candidates
James Edward Murray, incumbent United States Senator
Ray E. Gulick, farmer
Sam G. Feezell

Results

Republican primary

Candidates
Wesley A. D'Ewart, United States Congressman from Montana's 2nd congressional district
Robert Yellowtail, former Superintendent of the Crow Indian Reservation

Results

General election

Results

References

Montana
1954
1954 Montana elections